Idaea halmaea, the two-spotted wave, is a moth of the family Geometridae. The species was first described by Edward Meyrick in 1888. It is found in Australia, including Tasmania.

References

Sterrhini
Moths of Australia
Moths described in 1888